Ursula von Rydingsvard (née Karoliszyn; born 1942) is a sculptor who lives and works in Brooklyn, New York. She is best known for creating large-scale works influenced by nature, primarily using cedar and other forms of timber.

Early life and education 
Von Rydingsvard was born in Deensen, Germany in 1942 to a Polish mother and Ukrainian father. As a young child, the artist and her six siblings experienced the German occupation of Poland and the trauma of World War II, followed by five years in eight different German refugee camps for displaced Poles. In 1959, through the U.S. Marshall Plan and with the assistance of Catholic agencies, her family of peasant farmers boarded a ship to the United States where they eventually settled in Plainville, Connecticut. She received a BA and MA from University of Miami in Coral Gables, Florida in 1965 and an MFA from Columbia University in New York City in 1975. In the late 1970s, she was part of NYC's Cultural Council Foundation Artists' Project, which was funded under the Comprehensive Employment and Training Act (CETA).

Achievements

Major permanent commissions of her work are on view at the Microsoft Corporation, Redmond, WA; Storm King Art Center, New York; the Bloomberg Building, New York;  the Queens Family Courthouse, New York; the Nelson-Atkins, Kansas City, and the Barclays Center, Brooklyn, New York. Mad. Sq. Art: Ursula von Rydingsvard was the outdoor solo exhibition presented at Madison Square Park in 2006.

In 2008, she was inducted into the American Academy of Arts and Letters along with being featured in Art:21 Art in the Twenty-First Century on PBS. A monograph on her work titled The Sculpture of Ursula von Rydingsvard was published by Hudson Hills Press in 1996 and in 2011 Prestel published Ursula von Rydingsvard: Working. In 2014-2015 Ursula von Rydingsvard had her first British show at the Yorkshire Sculpture Park (West Yorkshire, UK), her most extensive exhibition to date. The exhibition was accompanied by the Ursula von Rydingsvard 2014 Catalogue, a major publication featuring text by Molly Donovan, Curator of Modern and Contemporary Art at the National Gallery of Art in Washington.

Museum collections 

Albright-Knox Art Gallery, Buffalo, New York
Aldrich Museum of Contemporary Art, Ridgefield, CT
Brooklyn Museum, Brooklyn, NY
Centre for Contemporary Art, Ujazdowski Castle, Warsaw, Poland
Cincinnati Art Museum, Cincinnati, OH
The Contemporary Austin, Austin, TX
Crystal Bridges Museum of American Art, Bentonville, AR
De Cordova Sculpture Park + Museum, Lincoln, MA
Detroit Institute of Arts, Detroit, MI
High Museum of Art, Atlanta, GA
Hood Museum of Art, Dartmouth, NH
Madison Art Center, Madison, WI
Madison Museum of Contemporary Art, Madison, WI
Metropolitan Museum of Art, New York, NY
Museum of Contemporary Art, Miami, FL
Museum of Fine Arts, Boston, Massachusetts
Museum of Modern Art New York, NY
National Gallery of Art, Washington, D.C.
Nelson-Atkins Museum of Art, Kansas City, MO
North Carolina Museum of Art, Raleigh, NC
Orlando Museum of Art, Orlando, FL
San Francisco Museum of Art, San Francisco, CA
Speed Art Museum, Louisville, Kentucky
Storm King Art Center, Mountainville, NY
Virginia Museum of Fine Arts, Richmond, VA
University of Michigan Museum of Art, Ann Arbor, MI
University of Texas Southwestern Medical Center, Dallas, TX
Walker Art Center, Minneapolis, MN
Weatherspoon Art Museum, Greensboro, North Carolina
Whitney Museum of American Art, New York, NY
Williams College, Williamstown, MA
Yale University Art Gallery, New Haven, CT

Notable exhibitions

2021 Ursula von Rydingsvard: Nothing But Art, National Museum, Kraków and simultaneously at the Center of Polish Sculpture, Orońsko and Łazienki Park, Warsaw, Poland
2018 Now, She, Philadelphia Museum of Art, Philadelphia, Pennsylvania
2018 The Contour of Feeling, The Fabric Workshop & Museum, Philadelphia, Pennsylvania
2015 Ursula von Rydingsvard, la Biennale di Venezia, Giardino della Marinaressa, Venice, Italy 
2014 Ursula von Rydingsvard, Yorkshire Sculpture Park, West Bretton, England
2011-12 Ursula von Rydingsvard: Sculpture 1991-2009, SculptureCenter, Queens, New York; traveled to deCordova Sculpture Park and Museum, Lincoln, Massachusetts; Museum of Contemporary Art, Cleveland, Ohio; and to Frost Art Museum, Miami, Florida
2006 Mad. Sq. Art: Ursula von Rydingsvard, Mad Sq Art at Madison Square Park, New York, NY
1992-4	Storm King Art Center, Mountainville, NY (Ten-year retrospective)

Awards and grants
Gold Medal for Merit to Culture – Gloria Artis, Poland, 2021
Artist Award for Distinguished Body of Work, CAA New York City, NY, 2019
Visionary Woman Honors Award, Moore College of Art & Design, Philadelphia, PA, 2017 
Lifetime Achievement Award, International Sculpture Center, Hamilton, NJ, 2014
Honoree, Storm King Art Center Annual Gala, New York, NY, 2012
Skowhegan Medal for Sculpture, Skowhegan School of Painting and Sculpture, Maine, 2011
Best Show in a Non-Profit Gallery or Space, American Section of the International Association of Art Critics, 2011
Rappaport Prize, DeCordova Museum and Sculpture Park, Lincoln, MA, 2008
Order of the Cross, Polish Consulate, New York, 2008
Mary Miss Resident in Visual Arts, American Academy in Rome, Italy, 2007
2nd prize, Best Show in a Commercial Gallery, American Section of the International Association of Art Critics, 2000
Academy Award in Art, American Academy of Arts and Letters, New York, NY, 1994
Best Small Museum Exhibition, American Section of the International Association of Art Critics, 1992
Honorary Doctorate, Maryland Institute College of Art, Baltimore, MD, 1991
Individual Artists Grant, National Endowment for the Arts, Washington, D.C., 1986
Athena Foundation Grant, Long Island City, NY, 1983
Guggenheim Fellowship, John Simon Guggenheim Foundation, New York, NY, 1983
Individual Artists Grant, National Endowment for the Arts, Washington, D.C., 1979
Individual Artists Grant, National Endowment for the Arts, Washington, D.C., 1978
Fulbright-Hayes Travel Grant, Washington, D.C., 1975

Cultural references 

 Daniel Traub feature-length documentary of the artist Ursula von Rydingsvard: Into Her Own, 2019

See also
 Inside the Artist's Studio, Princeton Architectural Press, 2015.

References

External links
Biography, interviews, essays, artwork images and video clips from PBS series Art:21 -- Art in the Twenty-First Century  - Season 4 (2007).
Ursula von Rydingsvard at Madison Square Park, New York
Ursula von Rydingsvard in Sculpture Magazine: A Conversation with Steven Oliver
Ursula von Rydingsvard in Works & Conversations
Ursula von Rydingsvard at Barclays Center, Brooklyn, NY
Ursula von Rydingsvard in Frieze Magazine: At The Height of Her Career
Ursula von Rydingsvard in The Philadelphia Inquirer

1942 births
People from Holzminden (district)
Polish refugees
Refugees in the United States
Polish emigrants to the United States
American women sculptors
Postmodern artists
Living people
20th-century American sculptors
21st-century American sculptors
20th-century American women artists
21st-century American women artists
Columbia University alumni
Recipients of the Gold Medal for Merit to Culture – Gloria Artis
Members of the American Academy of Arts and Letters